Malta Plateau is an ice-covered plateau of about  extent in the Victory Mountains of Victoria Land, Antarctica. The plateau is irregular in shape and is bounded on the south and west by Mariner Glacier, on the north by tributaries to Trafalgar Glacier, and on the east by tributaries to Borchgrevink Glacier. It was named by the New Zealand Antarctic Place-Names Committee to commemorate the island of Malta in association with the Victory Mountains. The plateau is part of the Melbourne Volcanic Province of the McMurdo Volcanic Group.

References

Plateaus of Antarctica
Landforms of Victoria Land
Borchgrevink Coast
Volcanoes of Victoria Land